Chinese Taipei competed in the 2009 East Asian Games which were held in Hong Kong, China from December 5, 2009 to December 13, 2009. Chinese Taipei finished fifth on the medal table with 8 gold medals.

References

2009 East Asian Games
Chinese Taipei at the East Asian Games
2009 in Taiwanese sport